Lajos Bruck (18461910) was a Hungarian painter. During his lifetime, his works were featured in Műcsarnok (Art Gallery). He is displayed in the Hungarian National Gallery.

References 

Jewish Encyclopedia

1846 births
1910 deaths
People from Pápa
19th-century Hungarian painters
20th-century Hungarian painters
Hungarian male painters
19th-century Hungarian male artists
20th-century Hungarian male artists